Alamannia or Alemannia was the territory inhabited by the Germanic Alemanni peoples 3rd century–911. "Alemannia" and similar spellings, is an exonym for Germany used in many other languages.

Alemannia or Alamannia may also refer to:

German sports teams
 Alemannia Aachen
 Alemannia Haibach
 Berliner FC Alemannia 1890
 BFC Alemannia 22
 FC Alemannia 1897 Karlsruhe
 SV Alemannia Waldalgesheim

Other uses
 418 Alemannia, an asteroid

See also
 
 
 Alemanni, a confederation of Germanic tribes
 Alamanni (surname)
 Alamania, a species of orchids
 Alemannic (disambiguation)
 Swabia, a cultural, historic and linguistic region in southwestern Germany